Daniel MacIvor (born July 23, 1962) is a Canadian actor, playwright, theatre director, and film director. He is probably best known for his acting roles in independent films and the sitcom Twitch City.

Personal
MacIvor was born in Sydney, Nova Scotia and educated at Dalhousie University in Halifax, and then at George Brown College in Toronto, Ontario. MacIvor is openly gay. He married Paul Goulet in 2006; they have since divorced. He has an Italian Greyhound, called 'Buddy'.

Career
In addition to his film and theatrical credits, MacIvor wrote the libretto to the opera "Hadrian," for which Rufus Wainwright wrote the music.

Theatre
MacIvor founded the theatre company da da kamera with Michele Jelley in 1986 to independently produce his own work. He was in residence at Buddies in Bad Times Theatre - for whom he has written, directed, and acted. His plays include Never Swim Alone, This is a Play, Monster, Marion Bridge, You are Here, Cul-de-sac, and A Beautiful View. Five of MacIvor's plays were published as I Still Love You in 2006, in celebration of the twentieth anniversary of da da kamera, (Never Swim Alone, The Soldier Dreams, You are Here, In on It, and A Beautiful View), and won MacIvor a coveted Governor General's Award for Drama.

Solo theatre work
MacIvor is particularly well known for a series of solo shows created in collaboration with director Daniel Brooks. These include House, Here Lies Henry, Monster and Cul-de-sac. These incorporate a minimalist and meta-theatrical style. In House and Here Lies Henry, MacIvor portrays one character who speaks directly to the audience, acknowledging their presence. While the direct address of the audience continues in Monster and Cul-de-sac, MacIvor portrays several characters throughout the course of the piece and this direct address is occasionally broken up by dialogue between these characters.

In 1992, 2-2 Tango was included in Making Out, the first anthology of Canadian plays by gay writers, alongside works by Ken Garnhum, Sky Gilbert, David Demchuk, Harry Rintoul and Colin Thomas.

The first three of these pieces were staged at Buddies in Bad Times Theatre in the 2006/2007 season as part of a tribute and retrospective of da da kamera's work.

MacIvor and Brooks later collaborated with Iris Turcott to create the play Who Killed Spalding Gray?, in which MacIvor performs the part of a fictional character partly based on the style of deceased American actor Spalding Gray.  The show premiered at the Halifax's Magnetic North Theatre Festival, and was later performed in Toronto at the Luminata Festival and at the High Performance Rodeo in Calgary

Film
In his early film work, MacIvor frequently collaborated with director Laurie Lynd, including on the short films RSVP in 1991, The Fairy Who Didn't Want to Be a Fairy Anymore in 1992, and the feature film House (1995).

In the early 2000s MacIvor wrote, co-wrote and directed several independent films, which were usually made in his home province of Nova Scotia. They include Past Perfect, Marion Bridge, Whole New Thing and Wilby Wonderful.

As an actor he appeared in Jeremy Podeswa's The Five Senses, had a recurring role in the television series Republic of Doyle and played Nathan in the iconic Canadian television series Twitch City.  In recent years MacIvor has been working with director Bruce McDonald as screenwriter of the films Trigger and Weirdos (for which MacIvor won a Canadian Screen Award in 2017 for best original screenplay).

Awards and honors
In addition to winning the Governor General's Award for Drama in 2006, MacIvor has won other notable awards during his career. Mr. MacIvor also has two Chalmers New Play Awards, once in 1997 and 1992.

Plays

In 1998, MacIvor won the award for overall excellence at the New York International Fringe Festival for his play Never Swim Alone.

In 2002, his play In On It earned him a GLAAD Award and a Village Voice Obie Award.

In 2008, he was awarded the Siminovitch Prize in Theatre.

Selected theatre work
 See Bob Run (1989), da da kamera, directed by Ken McDougall
 Yes I Am and Who Are You? (1989), Buddies in Bad Times, directed by Edward Roy
 Wild Abandon (1990), Theatre Passe Muraille, directed by Vinetta Strombergs
 Somewhere I Have Never Travelled (1990), Tarragon Theatre, directed by Andy McKim
 Never Swim Alone (1991), da da kamera, directed by Ken McDougall
 2-2 Tango (1991), Buddies in Bad Times, directed by Ken McDougall
 Jump (1992), Theatre Passe Muraille, directed by Daniel Brooks
 House (1992), da da kamera and the Factory Theatre
 This is a Play (1992), da da kamera, directed by Ken MacDougall
 The Lorca Play (1992), da da kamera, co-directed by MacIvor and Daniel Brooks
 Sessions (1995), Tarragon Theatre, with Daniel Brooks and Clare Coulter 
 Here Lies Henry (1995), Buddies in Bad Times Theatre
 The Soldier Dreams (1997), da da kamera at Canadian Stage Company
 Marion Bridge (1998), Mulgrave Road Theatre and da da kamera 
 Monster (1998), da da kamera at Canadian Stage Company, directed by Daniel Brooks
 In On It (2000), Edinburgh Festival, directed by MacIvor
 You Are Here (2001), da da kamera in association with Theatre Passe Muraille 
 Cul-de-Sac (2003), da da Kamera, directed by Daniel Brooks
 A Beautiful View (2006), da da kamera, directed by Daniel MacIvor 
 How It Works (2007), Tarragon Theatre, directed by Daniel MacIvor 
 His Greatness (2007), Vancouver Arts Club, directed by Linda Moore
 Confession (2008), Mulgrave Road Theatre, directed by Ann-Marie Kerr
 Communion (2010), Tarragon Theatre, directed by Daniel MacIvor
 This Is What Happens Next (2010), Canstage, directed by Daniel Brooks
 Bingo! (2011), Mulgrave Road Theatre 
 Was Spring (2012), Tarragon Theatre, directed by Daniel MacIvor 
 The Best Brothers (2012), Stratford Shakespeare Festival, directed by Dean Gabourie
 Arigato, Tokyo (2013), Buddies in Bad Times Theatre, directed by Brendan Healy
 Small Things (2014), Prairie Theatre Exchange, directed by Robert Metcalfe
 Who Killed Spalding Gray? (2014), Magnetic North Theatre Festival 
 "I, Animal" (2015), KAZAN CO-OP Theatre, directed by Richie Wilcox
 Cake & Dirt (2015), Tarragon Theatre, directed by Amiel Gladstone
 Let's Run Away (2019), Canadian Stage, directed by Daniel Brooks
 New Magic Valley Fun Town (2019), Tarragon Theatre, directed by Richard Rose

References

External links
 

1962 births
Living people
Canadian male stage actors
Canadian male film actors
20th-century Canadian dramatists and playwrights
21st-century Canadian dramatists and playwrights
Film directors from Nova Scotia
Canadian people of Scottish descent
Canadian gay writers
Canadian gay actors
LGBT film directors
People from Sydney, Nova Scotia
Male actors from Nova Scotia
Writers from Nova Scotia
Dora Mavor Moore Award winners
George Brown College alumni
Canadian LGBT dramatists and playwrights
Governor General's Award-winning dramatists
Canadian male dramatists and playwrights
Canadian male screenwriters
Canadian LGBT screenwriters
Best Screenplay Genie and Canadian Screen Award winners
Canadian Film Centre alumni
Opera librettists
Canadian male television actors
Canadian male voice actors
21st-century Canadian LGBT people
20th-century Canadian screenwriters
20th-century Canadian male writers
21st-century Canadian screenwriters
21st-century Canadian male writers
Gay screenwriters
Gay dramatists and playwrights